Asiatech was the trade name of Asia Motor Technologies France, a company founded in 2000 by Japanese private capital under the leadership of Dr. John Gano and Enrique Scalabroni, which purchased the assets of the Peugeot Formula One programme at the end of the 2000 season. Its mandate was to acquire top-level European engine technology for Asia and to create an Asian-themed F1 team. It increased staffing from 170 to 221 employees, supplied its engines in development for testing at no cost to minor teams in 2001 and 2002, and had designed and presented the wind-tunnel model of its original F1 chassis when its Japanese private funding failed in 2002. Asiatech returned the staff and facilities it had acquired back to Peugeot and wound down at the end of the 2002 season.

History 
Before the official name "Asiatech" was adopted, the purchasers of Peugeot Sport F1 were only known under the trade name of Asia Motor Technologies (AMT). This is reflected in the video game Formula One 2001, where Arrows' engine supplier is named "AMT" instead of Asiatech.

In 2001, Asiatech supplied their V10 engines to the Arrows Formula One team free of charge. For 2002 it tried for better results with Minardi. In that year, Arrows, that rented Cosworth engines, ran out of funding in mid-season 2002 and was liquidated. In that 2002 season, Asiatech's engine reliability increased to finish in fourth place out of the nine F1 engine suppliers, tied with BMW for reliability. Four out of the Minardi team’s 14 retirements during the season were engine-related.

Asiatech was also concurrently working on a GT sportscar design using a compact new engine, as well as having completed the complete design of an LMP1 sports car.

In 2002, Asiatech began considering the possibility of starting their own Formula One team, and purchased a former Williams design office in Didcot.  They also enlisted the help of Enrique Scalabroni, who designed a prototype F1 car. The car was to be firstly a testbed for Asiatech engines, then subsequently entered in the 2004 season. By May, there were reports that for the 2003 season Asiatech could supply Jordan with engines, or even buy the team out.  These came after Honda decided to concentrate their engine efforts on the BAR team, and announced they would be withdrawing supply from Eddie Jordan's team at the end of the 2002 season. However, when its Japanese private funding, reportedly from an heir to Sony, was cut off during the 2002 season, it announced its shutdown on 3 November 2002, with staff returning to Peugeot or moving on to Renault and other F1 engine programs. Some of the team's employees attempted to form a design and consultancy company as 'Design Tech Centre' but were unsuccessful.

In February 2003, the assets of the Asiatech engine company were sold in an auction in Paris, overseen by Jacques Martin and Gilles Chausselat.  Included in the auction were eighteen engines, a dyno, a variety of machine tools, plus electronic measuring equipment amongst other things.

Complete Formula One World Championship results
(key) (Races in bold indicate pole position) (Races in italics indicate fastest lap)

References

External links

Formula One engine manufacturers
Manufacturing companies established in 2000
Companies disestablished in 2002
Engine manufacturers of France